Camarones is a small settlement located in Chubut Province, Argentina. It is the head town of the Florentino Ameghino Department.

Climate
Camarones has a cold semi-arid climate (Köppen BSk). Frosts are common during the winter months, averaging 4–7 days from June to August. Overcast days are common, averaging 8–10 days and sunshine is low, averaging only 28-40% of possible sunshine.

Precipitation is low, averaging  a year, which is fairly evenly distributed throughout the year. Camarones receives 1960 hours of sunshine a year or about 42.9% of possible sunshine, ranging from a low of 75.0 hours in May to a high of 242 hours in January.

External links

References

Populated places in Chubut Province
Populated coastal places in Argentina
Municipalities of Argentina